Aethiessa floralis is a species of beetles belonging to the family Scarabaeidae, subfamily Cetoniinae.

Description
Basic color is shiny black–brown, with quite variable whitish markings, mainly in lateral margins. Adults can be seen from May to September mainly feeding on flowers of thistles (Silybum sp.), but also on Echium italicum.

Distribution and habitat
This species can be found in Italy, Spain, Slovenia and in North Africa from Morocco to Libya. These beetles prefer sunny or arid environments.

References
 Biolib
 Fauna Europaea
 Bedel L. (1889) Coléoptères du Nord de l'Afrique, Annales de la Société Entomologique de France. Paris 6(9):85-100
 Gory M.H. & Percheron M.A. (1833) Monographie des Cétoines et genres voisins, formant dans les familles naturelles de Latreille, le division des Scarabées Mélitophiles, J.B.Baillières editor. Paris :1-410
 Scarabs: World Scarabaeidae Database. Schoolmeesters P.

Cetoniinae
Beetles described in 1787